Lasta may refer to:
Lasta, an historical district in Ethiopia
Lasta (woreda), a current district in Ethiopia
Lasta, Greece, a town in Greece
Lasta Beograd, a bus company in Serbia
Lasta 95,  a Serbian-produced airplane